This was the first edition of the tournament.

Aleksandar Kovacevic won the title after defeating Alexandre Müller 6–3, 4–6, 6–2 in the final.

Seeds

Draw

Finals

Top half

Bottom half

References

External links
Main draw
Qualifying draw

Texas Tennis Classic - 1